The John Butler Trio are an Australian roots jam band. To date, they have released seven studio albums, four live albums, eleven singles, two EPs, and three video albums.

The John Butler Trio's second studio album, Three (2001), reached the top 30 on the Australian album charts and achieved platinum sales status. The band's subsequent studio albums titled Sunrise Over Sea (2004), Grand National (2007), and April Uprising (2010) all debuted at #1 on the Australian album charts with all three reaching platinum sales status.

The band's first live album titled Living 2001–2002 (2003) reached the top 10 and achieved platinum status in Australia. The band's second live album, Live at St. Gallen (2005), was successful as well achieving gold record status in Australia.

Studio albums

Live albums

EPs

Cassette

Singles

DVDs

Notes

A."Funky Tonight" was originally released as a non-album single, it subsequently appeared on the album, Grand National.
B."Good Excuse" was released as a radio promotional single only.
C."Funky Tonight" was performed by John Butler Trio and Keith Urban at 2007 ARIA Awards and the duet was released as a digital download single only.
D."Used to Get High" was released as a radio promotional single only.

References

General
  
 
 
 
 
Specific

External links

Discographies of Australian artists